Goethe-Plakette (Goethe Plaque) is the highest award by the Hessian Ministry for Science and the Arts of the federal state of Hesse, Germany, named after Johann Wolfgang von Goethe. It has been awarded since 1949 at irregular intervals. The award is given to individuals who have contributed to arts and culture in a special way and have been influential in the cultural development of the state of Hesse.

Recipients

  (1949)
  (1952)
  (1953)
 Erwin Piscator (1953)
 Rudolf Bultmann (1954)
  (1954)
 Rudolf Asbach (1954)
 Georg Muche (1955)
 Friedrich Noack (1955)
  (1955)
 Bernhard von Brentano (1955)
 Kasimir Edschmid (1955)
 Otto Ritschl (1955)
 Fritz von Unruh (1955)
 Carl Schuricht (1955)
  (1956)
  (1956)
 Hermann Kasack (1956)
 Hermann Heiß (1957)
  (1957)
  (1958)
  (1958)
 Boris Rajewsky (1958)
  (1960)
  (1964)
  (1968)
 Max Horkheimer (1970)
  (1971)
 Marie Luise Kaschnitz (1971)
  (1973)
 Karl Krolow (1975)
  (1975)
 Ernst Krenek (1978)
 Kurt Hessenberg (1979)
 Christine Brückner (1982)
  (1982)
  (1983)
 Hilmar Hoffmann (1985)
  (1987)
  (1992)
 Hans-Dieter Resch (1992)
 Hans Drewanz (1994)
  (1995)
  (1997)
  (1997)
  |(1997)
 Thomas Stellmach (1997)
 Willi Ziegler (1998)
  (2000)
  (2000)
 Helen Bonzel (2001)
 Michael Herrmann (2002)
  (2003)
  (2004)
 Wolfram Nicol (2005)
 Emil Mangelsdorff (2006)
 Wolfgang Seeliger (2006)
 Hans Hollmann (2006)
 Solf Schaefer (2007)
 Margareta Dillinger (2007)
  (2007)
 Martin Lutz (2007)
  (2007)
 Hermann Zapf (2007)
 Eike Wilm Schulte (2008)
  (2008)
  (2008)
 Udo Henke (2010)
  (2011)
  (2012)
  (2012)
 Max Hollein (2016)
  (2018)
 Nguyen Thien Nhan (2018)
  (2019)
 Werner Kleinkauf (2019)
  (2020)
  (2021)

References

External links
 

German awards
Culture of Hesse
1949 establishments in Germany
Awards established in 1949